Kandel is a Verbandsgemeinde ("collective municipality") in the district of Germersheim, Rhineland-Palatinate, Germany. The seat of the Verbandsgemeinde is in the town of Kandel.

The Verbandsgemeinde consists of the following Ortsgemeinden ("local municipalities"):

 Erlenbach bei Kandel
 Freckenfeld
 Kandel
 Minfeld
 Steinweiler
 Vollmersweiler
 Winden

Verbandsgemeinde in Rhineland-Palatinate